"I Shall Sing" is a song written by Northern Irish singer-songwriter Van Morrison. Morrison recorded it as part of the Moondance album sessions, but did not release the track. It was later released on CD in 2013. The song was also recorded by Art Garfunkel for his debut solo album, Angel Clare, released by Columbia Records in 1973. It was released as the second single from the album, peaking at No. 4 on the Billboard Adult Contemporary chart and No. 38 on the Billboard Hot 100.

The song has also been recorded by several notable artists including  Miriam Makeba (1970), Hortense Ellis (1971), King Sounds (1988), Judy Mowatt & The Gaytones (1974), and Marcia Griffiths (1993).

Chart performance

References

1973 singles
Columbia Records singles
1973 songs
Art Garfunkel songs
Songs written by Van Morrison